Desmia leucothyris is a moth in the family Crambidae. It was described by Paul Dognin in 1909. It is found in French Guiana.

References

Moths described in 1909
Desmia
Moths of South America